Coatlinchan is a town in the Mexican state of Mexico.

San Miguel Coatlinchán (in Nahuatl: Coatl, in, chantli, 'snake, possessive prefix, home' 'In the home of the snakes') is a locality of the state of Mexico, in the municipality of Texcoco. Nearby was the original location of the monolith of Tláloc, located today at the entrance of the National Museum of Anthropology in Mexico City.

Location and demographics

Elevation is denominated Sierra Quetzaltepec of which descends the stream Coatlinchán through the Barranca of Santa Clara.

Its main route of communication is the Federal Highway 136, former Mexico-Texcoco Highway and with which it is linked by two secondary branches; along the road are other communities of the municipality as San Bernardino, Montecillo and Santiago Cuautlalpan.

According to the Census of Population and Housing, conducted by the National Institute of Statistics and Geography in 2010, the total population of San Miguel Coatlinchán is 22,619 people, of which 11,089 are men and 11,530 are women. What makes it the second-most populated town in the municipality of Texcoco.

History

San Miguel Coatlinchán is a population of prehispanic origin, founded by towns of Chichimec origin, later the area was invaded by the Acolhuas that turned to Coatlinchán in the head of his señorío until around 1337 in which the head was moved to Tetzcuco, today Texcoco.

Monolith of Tláloc

The inhabitants of this time were skilled in the work of the stone, from then on the main monument that in time would make famous the population and that was a huge sculpture made in stone in which later it would be called like Barranca of Santa Clara. This monument is known today as the monolith of Tlaloc. However different theories exist on whether he represents Tlaloc or his Chalchiuhtlicue sister or wife, both deities of water and rain in Mesoamerican cultures.

The monument remained buried from the time of the conquest until the mid-nineteenth century, when a peasant who sought to gather wood to make firewood unearthed part of it, and was later fully discovered. In 1889 the painter José María Velasco realized a painting of the monolith, identifying it like Chalchiuhtlicue. In 1903 the archaeologist Leopoldo Batres identified it as Tláloc. However the population always knew the Piedra de los Tecomates, due to the circular crevices that the monument has in its center and which has the shape of a jicara or tecomate.

The population attributed to the sculpture various miraculous conditions, attributing to it the power to attract rain if the tecomates were wet or healing powers to the water that accumulated in them. The people gave offerings to the sculpture and asked for sufficient rains and good harvests. In addition, the monument was a tourist attraction of the population.

In 1963, the government of then-President Adolfo López Mateos, who was building the National Museum of Anthropology in Mexico City, expressed his intention to move the monolith from the Santa Clara Canyon to the new museum. Consequently, a desire was expressed to the community that held an Assembly in May 1963 in which it accepted the donation of the sculpture in exchange for several public works among which were: paving the junction with the Mexico-Texcoco highway, primary school until sixth grade, health center, water wells and pumping equipment.

The work for the transfer of the monolith was delayed throughout 1963 and early 1964, during which time the population began to express their opposition to the transfer, mainly considering that would lose a tourist attraction and therefore the economy of the locality would suffer and also by considerations about the affectation to the rains that would bring its absence.

With the imminence of the transfer, on February 23, 1964, the population rebelled, destroying the structures built to move it and deflating the tires of the trucks destined for the transfer. The government temporarily postponed the transfer, but on April 16 of the same year, it was supported by elements of the Mexican Army that occupied the population and prevented a new popular protest.

A colossal statue over a thousand years old that was thought to represent Tlaloc was found in the town of Coatlinchan, Mexico. This statue was made of basalt and weighed an estimated 168 tons. It was moved to the National Museum of Anthropology in Mexico City in 1964 on a special trailer with dozens of rubber tires. This did not happen until they promised the residents of the town to provide a large amount of public works. Some of the villagers still attempted to sabotage the vehicle, but the secular authority prevailed in the end. The village people lined up to watch the statue as it passed by. Then there was a large unseasonable downpour. The downpour continued through the night. Many people may have interpreted this as a sign from the gods. Some scholars believe that the statue may not have been Tlaloc at all but his sister or some other female deity.

See also
List of megalithic sites

References

Populated places in the State of Mexico
Texcoco, State of Mexico